André Ouellet,  (born April 6, 1939) is a former longtime Liberal federal politician and Cabinet member in Canada.  Following his political career, he served as chairman of Canada Post.

First elected to the House of Commons of Canada in a 1967 by-election, Ouellet served in a number of different positions in the cabinets of Prime Ministers Pierre Trudeau and Jean Chrétien. In his capacity as Registrar General of Canada, he was one of the four signatories of the Proclamation of the Constitution Act of 1982 (along with Queen Elizabeth II, Prime Minister Trudeau, and Justice Minister Jean Chrétien).   Ouellet represented the safe Liberal seat of Papineau in Montreal for almost thirty years. His hold on the seat was only seriously threatened when the Liberals were crushed by the Progressive Conservative Party in the election of 1984, when he retained his seat by only 500 votes.  In opposition, Ouellet became the Liberal's leading figure in the constitutional negotiations that led to the Charlottetown Accord, and was a strong advocate for the constitutional reform proposal, which was rejected in a 1992 referendum.

With the return to power of the Liberals after the 1993 election, Ouellet was appointed Minister of Foreign Affairs by the new prime minister, Jean Chrétien. Ouellet was seen as lacking experience in international relations but was a principled and pragmatic Minister of Foreign Affairs. Despite his experience, Ouellet was not popular in Quebec, and the lasting legacy of the Charlottetown Accord hurt him.  After the close result of the 1995 Quebec referendum, Chrétien wanted to present a new face of his government in Quebec. In 1996, Chrétien appointed Ouellet to head the Canada Post Corporation. Ouellet's seat in the House of Commons of Canada was taken by Pierre Pettigrew in a by-election later that year.

As cabinet minister, Ouellet had served as Postmaster General. As chairman of Canada Post, he implemented reform that led to record profits in the corporation.  In 2004, controversy surrounded Ouellet as Canada Post was one of the organizations embroiled in the Sponsorship Scandal. As a result, Ouellet was suspended from his position at Canada Post in February 2004 by Prime Minister Paul Martin. He resigned as chairman of Canada Post on August 12, 2004, after it was revealed that he failed to provide invoices for hundreds of thousands of dollars of personal expenses, and that he handed out untendered contracts.

Electoral record (partial)

References

External links
 
 André Ouellet fonds, Library and Archives Canada

1939 births
Living people
Liberal Party of Canada MPs
Members of the House of Commons of Canada from Quebec
Postmasters General of Canada
Canadian Ministers of Foreign Affairs
Corruption in Canada
Members of the 22nd Canadian Ministry
Members of the 23rd Canadian Ministry
Members of the 26th Canadian Ministry
Canadian King's Counsel
French Quebecers